The Grammy Award for Best R&B Performance by a Duo or Group with Vocal was awarded between 1970 and 2011.  From 1967 to 1969 and in 1971 the award included instrumental performances.  The award had several minor name changes:

From 1967 to 1968 the award was known as Best Rhythm & Blues Group Performance, Vocal or Instrumental
In 1969 it was awarded as Best Rhythm & Blues Performance by a Duo or Group, Vocal or Instrumental
In 1970 it was awarded as Best R&B Vocal Performance by a Duo or Group
In 1971 it was awarded as Best R&B Performance by a Duo or Group, Vocal or Instrumental
In 1972 it was awarded as Best R&B Vocal Performance by a Group
From 1973 to 1980 it was awarded as Best R&B Vocal Performance by a Duo, Group or Chorus
From 1981 to 2003 it was awarded as Best R&B Performance by a Duo or Group with Vocal 
In 2004 it was awarded as Best R&B Performance by a Duo or Group with Vocals

The award has been discontinued after 2011 in a major overhaul of Grammy categories. As of 2012, all solo and duo/group vocal performances in the R&B category were shifted to the newly formed Best R&B Performance category.

Years reflect the year in which the Grammy Awards were handed out, for music released in the previous year.

Recipients

Category Records
Most Wins

Most Nominations

References

Grammy Awards for rhythm and blues